Cristoberea assamensis is a species of longhorn beetle in the subfamily Lamiinae, and the only species in the genus Cristoberea. It was described by Stephan von Breuning in 1954 and is endemic to India.

References

Saperdini
Beetles described in 1954
Endemic fauna of India